{{Infobox election
| election_name = 1991 Mississippi gubernatorial election
| type = presidential
| country = Mississippi
| flag_image = Flag of Mississippi (1894-1996).svg
| previous_election = 1987 Mississippi gubernatorial election
| previous_year = 1987
| next_election = 1995 Mississippi gubernatorial election
| next_year = 1995
| ongoing = no
| election_date = November 5, 1991
| registered = 
| turnout = 
| image1 = 
| nominee1 = Kirk Fordice
| party1 = Republican Party (United States)
| popular_vote1 = 361,500
| percentage1 = 50.83%
| image2 = 
| nominee2 = Ray Mabus
| party2 = Democratic Party (United States)
| popular_vote2 = 338,459| percentage2 = 47.59%
| map_image = 1991 Mississippi gubernatorial election results map by county.svg
| map_size = 250px
| map_alt = 
| map = 
| map_caption = County results Fordice:Mabus:   
| title = Governor
| before_election = Ray Mabus
| before_party = Democratic Party (United States)
| after_election = Kirk Fordice
| after_party = Republican Party (United States)
}}

The 1991 Mississippi gubernatorial election' took place on November 5, 1991 to elect the Governor of Mississippi. Incumbent Democrat Ray Mabus unsuccessfully ran for reelection to a second term. This election marked the first time a Republican was elected Governor of Mississippi since Adelbert Ames in 1873.

This is the last gubernatorial election where the Democratic candidate carried any of three counties (Hancock, Harrison and Jackson) along the Mississippi Gulf Coast.

Democratic primary
Incumbent Democrat Ray Mabus won the Democratic primary, defeating former U.S. Representative Wayne Dowdy and George "Wagon Wheel" Blair. According to The New York Times,'' Mabus had to fend off charges that he was "arrogant and out of touch with Mississippi politically", and was perceived as a "Porsche politician in a Chevy pickup state".

Results

Republican primary
No candidate received a majority in the Republican primary, so a runoff was held between the top two candidates. The runoff election was won by businessman Kirk Fordice, who defeated State Auditor Pete Johnson.

Results

Runoff

General election

Results

References

1991
gubernatorial
Mississippi
November 1991 events in the United States